IFK Göteborg had a near-miss season, losing a decisive match against AIK, where a win would have clinched the title. In spite of Thomas Olsson giving Blåvitt the lead, goals from Antônio Flávio and Daniel Tjernström saw the grip slip out of IFK's hands. Adding to the misery, AIK also won the cup final clash between the sides.

Most notable in the season was the success of Tobias Hysén, scoring 18 goals in the league, the highest number for the club for more than ten years.

Squad

Goalkeepers
  Kim Christensen
  Marcus Sandberg

Defenders
  Karl Svensson
  Nicklas Carlsson
  Petter Björlund
  Tuomo Turunen
  Adam Johansson
  Ragnar Sigurðsson
  Gustaf Svensson
  Hjálmar Jónsson
  Erik Lund
  Sebastian Eriksson
  Mikael Dyrestam

Midfielders
  Thomas Olsson
  Stefan Selaković
  Jakob Johansson
  Daniel Alexandersson
  Niclas Alexandersson
  Tobias Sana
  Teddy Bjarnason

Attackers
  Tobias Hysén
  Robin Söder
  Hannes Stiller
  Niklas Bärkroth

Allsvenskan

Matches

 Helsingborg-IFK Göteborg 1-0
 1-0 Marcus Lantz 
 IFK Göteborg-Djurgården 6-0
 1-0 Stefan Selaković 
 2-0 Robin Söder 
 3-0 Tobias Hysén 
 4-0 Tobias Hysén 
 5-0 Ragnar Sigurðsson 
 6-0 Pontus Wernbloom 
 Häcken-IFK Göteborg 4-1
 1-0 Paulinho 
 2-0 Josef Karlsson 
 3-0 Mathias Ranégie 
 4-0 Mathias Ranégie 
 4-1 Tobias Hysén 
 IFK Göteborg-Örgryte 3-0
 1-0 Tobias Hysén 
 2-0 Stefan Selaković 
 3-0 Ragnar Sigurðsson 
 Hammarby-IFK Göteborg 0-1
 0-1 Robin Söder 
 IFK Göteborg-Örebro 1-0
 1-0 Tobias Hysén 
 Elfsborg-IFK Göteborg 2-0
 1-0 Daniel Mobaeck 
 2-0 Emir Bajrami 
 IFK Göteborg-Gefle 3-0
 1-0 Pontus Wernbloom 
 2-0 Pontus Wernbloom 
 3-0 Ragnar Sigurðsson 
 IFK Göteborg-Kalmar FF 2-1
 1-0 Tobias Hysén 
 2-0 Tobias Hysén 
 2-1 Abiola Dauda 
 GAIS-IFK Göteborg 0-1
 0-1 Tobias Hysén 
 IFK Göteborg-Malmö FF 2-0
 1-0 Pontus Wernbloom 
 2-0 Tobias Hysén 
 IFK Göteborg-Brommapojkarna 4-0
 1-0 Pontus Wernbloom 
 2-0 Niklas Bärkroth 
 3-0 Stefan Selaković 
 4-0 Niklas Bärkroth 
 Halmstad-IFK Göteborg 0-0
 AIK-IFK Göteborg 1-0
 1-0 Nils-Eric Johansson 
 IFK Göteborg-Trelleborg 3-1
 1-0 Jakob Johansson 
 2-0 Thomas Olsson 
 2-1 Fredrik Jensen 
 3-1 Ragnar Sigurðsson 
 Trelleborg-IFK Göteborg 2-1
 0-1 Gustav Svensson 
 1-1 Andreas Drugge 
 2-1 Andreas Wihlborg 
 IFK Göteborg-Häcken 2-2
 0-1 Mattias Östberg 
 0-2 Johan Karlsson 
 1-2 Hannes Stiller 
 2-2 Thomas Olsson 
 Örgryte-IFK Göteborg 1-2
 1-0 Alex 
 1-1 Tobias Hysén 
 1-2 Tobias Hysén 
 IFK Göteborg-Helsingborg 2-2
 1-0 Sebastian Eriksson 
 2-0 Erik Lund 
 2-1 René Makondele 
 2-2 René Makondele 
 Djurgården-IFK Göteborg 0-0
 IFK Göteborg-Elfsborg 4-0
 1-0 Hjálmar Jónsson 
 2-0 Hannes Stiller 
 3-0 Hannes Stiller 
 4-0 Tobias Hysén 
 Gefle-IFK Göteborg 0-3
 0-1 Hannes Stiller 
 0-2 Gustav Svensson 
 0-3 Hannes Stiller 
 IFK Göteborg-Hammarby 2-0
 1-0 Tobias Hysén 
 2-0 Tobias Hysén 
 Örebro-IFK Göteborg 0-0
 Kalmar FF-IFK Göteborg 2-1
 1-0 Abiola Dauda 
 1-1 Hannes Stiller 
 2-1 Ricardo Santos 
 IFK Göteborg-GAIS 2-1
 1-0 Stefan Selaković 
 1-1 Eyjólfur Héðinsson 
 2-1 Stefan Selaković 
 Malmö FF-IFK Göteborg 0-1
 0-1 Thomas Olsson 
 Brommapojkarna-IFK Göteborg 0-3
 0-1 Tobias Hysén 
 0-2 Niclas Alexandersson 
 0-3 Tobias Hysén 
 IFK Göteborg-Halmstad 2-2
 0-1 Emir Kujović 
 0-2 Jónas Guðni Sævarsson 
 1-2 Tobias Hysén 
 2-2 Tobias Hysén 
 IFK Göteborg-AIK 1-2
 1-0 Thomas Olsson 
 1-1 Antônio Flávio 
 1-2 Daniel Tjernström

Topscorers
  Tobias Hysén 18
  Hannes Stiller 6
  Stefan Selaković 5
  Pontus Wernbloom 5
  Thomas Olsson 4
  Ragnar Sigurðsson 4

IFK Göteborg seasons
IFK Goteborg